Shihezi University (SHZU) is a public university located in Shihezi, Xinjiang, China. Founded in 1996, it is administered by the Xinjiang Production and Construction Corps (XPCC) and co-funded by the Ministry of Education under the Chinese state Double First Class University Plan and former "Project 211" for national key universities.

In August 2000, the Central Government designated Shihezi University as a key institution to develop in northwestern China. The university has been developing with the support of several leading institutions in China, including Peking University, Huazhong University of Science and Technology, East China University of Science and Technology, Huazhong Agricultural University, Chongqing University, Jiangnan University, University of International Business and Economics, Nanjing Normal University, and South China Agricultural University. It became a "Double First Class University‘ identified by the Ministry of Education of China in 2017.

History 
Shihezi University was officially formed in September 1996 with the merge of Shihezi Medical College (est. 1949), Shihezi Agricultural College (est. 1959), XPCC Vocational College of Economics (est. 1959), and XPCC Vocational College of Education (est. 1960).

Academics
Shihezi University offers 10 specialties—Agriculture, Medicine, Engineering, Economics and Trade, Management, Literature and Arts, Sciences, Education, Law, and History. It has 23 colleges, offering 10 doctorate degrees, 60 master's degrees, 97 bachelor's degrees,1 pre-university senior middle school programs, five specialties that enroll on-job-teachers for master's degrees, two post-doctoral scientific work station, four post-doctoral mobile stations. The university has jointly set up graduate education bases with Peking University and Tianjin University, as well as a program for culture-oriented quality education.

The university has 11 disciplines of Ministry of Agriculture, Xinjiang Uygur Autonomous Region (XUAR) and the Xinjiang Production and Construction Corps (XPCC), three key laboratories co-constructed and supported by the Ministry of Education, the Ministry of Science and Technology, and the XPCC. It has two key laboratories of XPCC, two key bases for art and scientific research, and 24 graduate schools and research centers. The university has become a key scientific research base of XPCC and XUAR.

Rankings and reputation

Faculty and students
The university has 2,600 staff. There are 1,894 full-time teachers including two academician of the Chinese Academy of Engineering, 355 professors, 706 associate professors, 58 experts and scholars receiving outstanding achievement awards at national and provincial level, and 81 distinguished experts and scholars receiving special subsidies from the government. It employs more than 10 foreign experts and teachers every year.

Students come from 31 provinces and regions. The student population is currently 41,000, including 22,462 undergraduates, 6482 postgraduates and 415 international students from countries such as United States, India, Russia, Pakistan, Bangladesh, Kazakhstan, Afghanistan, etc.

Campus

The campus covers 1,802,000 square meters. It has 1,214,000 square meters of building, and the area of its laboratories is 184,100 square meters. The library has a collection of 3,000,000 Chinese and foreign books and periodicals, and is only one model project in Xinjiang, as university digital libraries in State High-tech Project 863. It has a book collection spot of the UN's Food and Agriculture Organization (FAO).

Location
The university is located in Shihezi, the Garden City, by the river of Manas on the northern foot of the Tianshan Mountains in Xinjiang.

References

Shihezi University (Official site for International Students)

Further reading
 McGregor, Richard. The Party: The Secret World of China's Communist Rulers. Harper Perennial: New York, 2012. . Originally published in 2010 by Allen Lane, a Penguin Books imprint.

External links

Shihezi University 

 
Medical schools in China
Universities in China with English-medium medical schools
Universities and colleges in Xinjiang
Educational institutions established in 1996
1996 establishments in China
Shihezi